Never Told a Soul is the first solo album by John Illsley, a founding member of Dire Straits.

Track listing
All tracks composed by John Illsley
"Boy with Chinese Eyes"  
"The Night Café"  
"Never Told a Soul" 
"Jimmy on the Central Line"  
"Northern Land"  
"Another Alibi"  
"Let The River Flow"

Personnel
John Illsley - vocals, bass, acoustic guitar
Mark Knopfler - guitars
Phil Palmer - guitars
Kevin Jarvis - piano, Fairlight CMI, Hammond Organ
Terry Williams - drums
Bobby Valentino - violin
Jodie Linscott - percussion
Martin Drover - trumpet, flugelhorn on "Northern Land"
Chris White - tenor and alto saxophone

Recording
Recorded at Parkgate Studios, East Sussex
Mixed at Air Studios, London

John Illsley albums
1984 debut albums
Vertigo Records albums